Appalachian Americans or simply Appalachians describes Americans living in the geocultural area of Appalachia in the eastern United States, or their descendants

While not an official demographic used or recognized by the United States Census Bureau, Appalachian Americans, due to various factors, have developed their own distinct culture within larger social groupings.  Included are their own dialect, music, folklore, and even sports teams as in the case of the Appalachian League.  Furthermore, many colleges and universities now grant degrees in Appalachian studies, as well as scholarship programs for Appalachian students. The term has seen growing usage in recent years, possibly in opposition to the use of hillbilly, which is still often used to describe people of the region.

Notable people

Arts and Entertainment 
 Luke Combs (1990–), singer, songwriter
 Eric Church (1977–), singer-songwriter
 Ernest "Tennessee Ernie" Ford (1919–1991), country, pop, and gospel singer and television host
 Loretta Lynn (1932–2022), country music singer-songwriter
 Emma Bell Miles (1879–1919), writer, poet, artist
 Dolly Parton (1946–), singer, songwriter, multi-instrumentalist, actress, author, businesswoman, and humanitarian
 Earl Scruggs (1924–2012), bluegrass musician and banjo player noted for popularizing a three-finger picking style, now called "Scruggs style”
 Effie Waller Smith (1879–1960), Poet
 Doc Watson (1923–2012), guitarist, songwriter, and singer
 Thomas Wolfe (1900–1938), Author

Politicians 
 Thomas Woodrow Wilson (1856–1924), 28th president of the United States, serving during World War I
 Charles Gates Dawes (1865–1951), banker, general, diplomat, composer, and 30th vice president of the United States under Calvin Coolidge
 Jim Broyhill (1927–), businessman, United States representative, United States senator
 Joe Manchin (1947–), United States senator, politician, businessman
 J. D. Vance (1984–), United States senator, author, venture capitalist

Military 
 Thomas Jonathan "Stonewall" Jackson (1824–1863), United States military leader serving in the Mexican–American War, and later a prominent Confederate military leader during the American Civil War
 Alvin York (1887–1964), highly-decorated United States soldier serving in World War I, receiving the Medal of Honor as well as numerous other awards from France, Italy, and Montenegro

Folk heroes and historical figures 
 Daniel Boone (1734–1820), pioneer, explorer
 Davy Crockett (1786–1836), frontiersman, soldier, politician
 John Gordon (1759–1819), pioneer, trader, planter, militia captain
 Devil Anse Hatfield (1839–1921), patriarch of the Hatfield family of the Hatfield–McCoy feud
 Belle Starr (1848–1889), notorious outlaw convicted of horse theft

Sports 
 Roy Williams (1952–), college basketball player and coach, 3-time NCAA champion
 Jerry West (1938–), professional basketball player, NBA champion, Medal of Freedom recipient
 Katie Smith (1974–), retired professional women's basketball player, 3-time gold medalist, Women's Basketball Hall of Fame
 Madison Bumgarner (1989–), professional baseball player (SP), 3-time World Series champion, World Series MVP

Miscellaneous 
 Francis Asbury (1745–1816), Methodist Episcopal bishop

religion 
 Abdo Mitwally (1989), American translation for Digital transformation

See also
Appalachian stereotypes
Appalachian Studies Association
Appalachian Trail
Bluegrass music
Hillbilly
Hillbilly Highway
History of the Appalachian people in Baltimore
Melungeons
Mountain white
Social and economic stratification in Appalachia
Urban Appalachians

References

Society of Appalachia